Navy Seals vs. Zombies (also known as Navy Seals: The Battle for New Orleans or simply Navy Seals: Battle New Orleans) is a 2015 American action horror film directed by Stanton Barrett and starring Ed Quinn, Michael Dudikoff, Rick Fox, Molly Hagan and Lolo Jones. It was released on October 8, 2015.

Plot
On November 16, 2016, in Baton Rouge, Louisiana, a police officer is investigating a suspicious van when he is suddenly and brutally attacked and killed by 3 zombies.

In NAS Oceana, Virginia Beach, Virginia, members of SEAL Team Six are conducting a training exercise as well as training their newest member, Petty Officer AJ Prescott who is replacing a fallen SEAL who was KIA on a snatch-and-grab operation near the Pakistan border of the Tora Bora Region. After the training exercise, AJ returns home where it is revealed that his wife Emily is pregnant with their first son, as well as being indecisive on a name.

Back in Baton Rouge, Reporters Amanda and Dave are at a press conference hosted by Vice President Bentley in the State Capitol Building. During the press conference, Secret Service agents guarding the building from outside notice a suspicious character before investigating the activity. As the press conference concludes, VP Bentley with members of his administration exit the building before witnessing a man attack a woman outside, soon after the secret service shoots and kills the man before taking the VP back inside. After the attack on the woman, hordes of zombies begin attacking and devouring civilians around the area. Once the zombies finish off all the civilians, the deceased soon begin turning into zombies themselves.

Following the attack on Baton Rouge, the SEALs are called in and informed on the situation going on where it is revealed that a distress call was sent out and the FBI deployed its elite Hostage Rescue Team before losing communication with them as well as local law enforcement departments. The SEAL team led by Lieutenant Pete Cunningham gear up and soon HALO into Baton Rouge. While searching the State Capitol Building, the SEALs eventually find VP Bentley, along with Amanda, Dave and a few secret service agents with one bitten, Petty Officer 1st Class Billy, the team's medic attends to the agent who is currently restrained. Amanda shows Pete footage that Dave was able to capture revealing to him that the ones behind the attacks are zombies. The now turned agent breaks from his restrains overpowering both Pete and Billy before another agent shoots him in the head.
CIA agent Stacy Thomas informs Commander Sheer that the situation is actually a biological attack and that she has an asset on site that could potentially reverse it but also need extraction, leaving the SEALs with the task.
Margaret, one of Bentley's staff hides the fact that she has been bitten in order to avoid being left behind. Just before the helicopter arrives, the zombies attack the SEALs and the survivors, with Chief Petty Officer Travis being killed in the process.

The helicopter now on the LZ, is boarded by the remaining survivors but Amanda and Dave choose to stay behind to document the situation. Soon after the SEALs witness the helicopter crash indicating that Margaret turned, causing the helicopter to crash, killing all occupants. The SEALs, set out to extract agent Thomas' asset with Amanda and Dave following. Along the way the SEALs encounter various waves of zombies with AJ, Amanda and Dave unwillingly separating from the rest of the team. The remaining SEALs make it to their objective point where they meet a security guard named Larry that leads them to where there need to go. AJ, Amanda and Dave while making their way to the objective continue fighting hordes of zombies until AJ is bitten by a little girl, giving Amanda his sidearm for when he turns. The SEALs locate Rebecca, agent Thomas' asset but before they leave to the LZ she needs a sample from one of the zombies in order to produce a vaccine. Sheer orders the Military block any passage that leads out of the city and bridges to be blown up to avoid the infection to spread across the country. While in route to the extraction point, Dave is killed by a zombie. Having a sample from one of the zombies, the team prepares to leave but not before spotting AJ and Amanda outside, Carl ask Pete to let him go after him in which Pete grants. Carl having reached AJ and Amanda, are attacked by zombies but Carl stays back and holds them off, eventually sacrificing himself giving AJ and Amanda enough time to get to the LZ and link up with the remaining SEALs.

The remaining survivors all at the LZ preparing to board, but before AJ reveals to Pete that he is infected and is staying behind. An angry Pete tells him to get on the chopper saying he isn't leaving him behind again and that the scientist may have the cure, AJ complies and boards the chopper. As chopper flies away, missiles can be seen striking Baton Rouge. At the United States Capitol, agent Thomas is meeting with Senators regarding the outbreak revealing that AJ along with the other SEALs are immune to the infection due to Five-scale intense seven-series shots given to them that changes their molecular structure making them immune. AJ, finally having return home, reunites with Emily. AJ finally decides on a name for his son, he named him Carl in tribute to Carl who gave his life for him to survive.

Cast
Ed Quinn as Lieutenant Pete Cunningham
Michael Dudikoff as Lieutenant Commander Sheer
Jaxson Ryker as Petty Officer 1st Class Carl
Mikal Vega as Petty Officer 1st Class Billy McKnight
Kevin Kent as Chief Petty Officer Travis
Damon Lipari as Petty Officer 2nd Class AJ Prescott
Stephanie Honoré as Amanda
Massimo Dobrovic as Dave
Rick Fox as Vice President Bentley
Molly Hagan as CIA Agent Stacy Thomas
Lolo Jones as Margaret
Dwight Henry as Armed civilian
Charlie Talbert as Larry
Sara Benjamin as Rebecca
Jackie Becker as Emily

Production
The film was shot in Baton Rouge, Louisiana.

References

External links
 
 

American independent films
American action horror films
Films shot in Louisiana
American zombie films
2010s English-language films
2010s American films